The North Alliance (NoA) is a Scandinavian agency network, working with design, communication and technology. Founded in 2014, it is organized as a holding company and consists of 26 cooperating agencies in Denmark, Norway, Sweden, Finland and Poland with over 1250 employees. In 2016 the combined turnover was estimated at around €100 million.

Agencies 

 &Co
 Åkestam Holst
 Anorak
 Axenon
 BKRY
 Bold
 NoA Consulting
 NoA Connect
 NoA Health
 NoA Ignite
 North Kingdom
 Unfold
 Agitec
 Bluebird
 Scienta 
 Bob the Robot 
 DK&A

History  
The conglomerate was formed in January 2014 by Thomas Høgebøl, former head of McCann Worldgroup, backed by Finnish private equity fund CapMan Group. 2017 Capman Group exited and the private equity firm Norvestor stepped in as new owner of NoA.

References

External links 
 

Companies established in 2014
2014 establishments in Norway